Manu Dagher (born 12 October 1984) is a Liberian-Dutch footballer who plays as a striker. He is signed to Waltham Forest in England and was also a member of the Liberia national football team.

Club career
Dagher played for the Baronie and Heerenveen youth teams. He was released by Eerste Divisie side FC Dordrecht after the 2007/08 season and in September 2009 he signed a contract with Dutch non-league side Kozakken Boys from Werkendam. Dagher stated he still wanted to succeed in football. He scored on his debut in a 3-5 away win at Zwaluwen '30.

In August 2011 he signed for Waltham Forest.

Personal life
He left his native and war-torn Liberia by himself in 2002 to end up in a Dutch camp for pro club seekers near Breda. In Holland he later met his future wife Maima and they later had two children called Cheyenne and Nadim Dagher.

References

External links 
Manu Dagher at Voetbal International
 Liberiaanse striker Dagher to Kozakken Boys 25 September 2009, Dutch
 A-selectie Kozakken Boys 25 September 2009, Dutch
 Striking debut substitute Manu Dagher 28 September 2009, Dutch

1984 births
Living people
People from Lofa County
Association football forwards
Dutch footballers
Liberian footballers
FC Dordrecht players
Kozakken Boys players
Waltham Forest F.C. players
Liberian expatriate footballers
Expatriate footballers in England